The Mayotte scops owl (Otus mayottensis) is a species of owl in the family Strigidae.
It is endemic to the island of Mayotte in the Comoros.

Taxonomy
The Mayotte scops owl has been considered to be conspecific with the Pemba scops owl (Otus pembaensis), the Anjouan scops owl (Otus capnodes), the rainforest scops owl and the Torotoroka scops owl (Otus madagascariensis under O. rutilus), but this species has now been split and the Mayotte scops owl is now regarded as its own species, mainly based on its very different call. The scops owls of Madagascar, Comoros and Seychelles form a clade within the genus Otus with the Oriental scops owl (Otus sunia) and are not closely related to the continental African scops owls.

Description
The Mayotte scops owl is very similar to the rainforest scops owl (Otus rutilus) with which it was once considered conspecific. The upperparts are plain brown marked with faint light spots while the underparts are paler brown than the upperparts. The facial disk is also brownish with a contrasting darker rim restricted to just the sides and not seen above the eyes. The crown is brown with darker streaks and the flanks are more reddish-brown with short dark streaks. The eyes are yellow.

Voice
The call of the Mayotte scops owl is a series of 3–11 deep, single hoots.

Distribution and habitat
It is endemic to Maore island in Mayotte. where it is common and widespread. The habitat of the Mayotte scops owl is subtropical or tropical moist lowland forests.

Status
The population of the Mayotte scops owl is thought to be stable as there is no evidence for any decline or of any substantial threats, thus it is categorised as least concern.

References

Mayotte scops owl
Birds of Mayotte
Endemic birds of the Comoros
Mayotte stops owl
Taxa named by Constantine Walter Benson
Taxonomy articles created by Polbot
Endemic fauna of Mayotte